Union Oyster House, open to diners since 1826, is amongst the oldest operating restaurants in the United States, and the oldest known that has been continuously operating since being opened. The building was listed as a National Historic Landmark on May 27, 2003.

History
The building itself was built prior to 1714, most likely in 1704. Before it became a restaurant, Hopestill Capen's dress goods business occupied the property. In 1771 printer Isaiah Thomas published his newspaper, The Massachusetts Spy, from the second floor. The restaurant originally opened as the Atwood & Bacon Oyster House on August 3, 1826.

The Union Oyster House has had a number of famous people in history as diners, including the Kennedy family and Daniel Webster. Webster was known for regularly consuming at least six plates of oysters. Perhaps most surprisingly, in 1796 Louis Philippe, King of the French from 1830 to 1848, lived in exile on the second floor. He earned his living by teaching French to young women. Labor economist and president of Haverford College John Royston Coleman worked here incognito as a "salad-and-sandwich man" for a time in the 1970s and documented the experience in his book The Blue Collar Journal.

The menu is traditional New England fare, including seafoods such as oysters, clams, and lobsters, as well as poultry, baked beans, steak and chops.

Image gallery

See also

 List of the oldest restaurants in the United States
 Cuisine of New England
 List of National Historic Landmarks in Boston
 List of seafood restaurants
 National Register of Historic Places listings in northern Boston, Massachusetts

References

External links
 Official website

Houses completed in 1704
National Historic Landmarks in Boston
Oyster bars in the United States
Restaurants in Boston
Seafood restaurants in Massachusetts
Restaurants on the National Register of Historic Places in Massachusetts
Houses in Boston
1826 establishments in Massachusetts
American companies established in 1826
Restaurants established in 1826
Houses on the National Register of Historic Places in Suffolk County, Massachusetts
Historic district contributing properties in Massachusetts
National Register of Historic Places in Boston
Louis Philippe I